The Quitter is a 1916 American silent Western film directed by Charles Horan and starring Lionel Barrymore. It was produced by Rolfe Photoplays and distributed by Metro Pictures.

A copy is reportedly held at Nederlands Filmmuseum, now called EYE Film Institute at Amsterdam.

Cast

 Lionel Barrymore as "Happy" Jack Lewis
 Marguerite Skirvin as Glad Mason
 Paul Everton as W. E. Willet
 Charles Prince as "Big" Bill McFarland
 Julius D. Cowles as Seth Moore
 Edward Brennan as Peter Condon
 Saagar Bains as himself

See also
 Lionel Barrymore filmography

References

External links

 
 

1916 films
1916 Western (genre) films
American black-and-white films
Metro Pictures films
Silent American Western (genre) films
1910s American films
1910s English-language films